Hlemmur may refer to:
 Hlemmur (terminal), a bus station in Reykjavík, Iceland
 Hlemmur (film), an Icelandic documentary released in 2002
 Hlemmur (soundtrack), the soundtrack for the film by Sigur Rós